Ryan T. Okahara is a United States Air Force brigadier general serving as the Air National Guard assistant to the commander of the United States Space Command. Previously, he served as Air National Guard assistant to the commander of the Space Operations Command. He has also served as commander of the Hawaii Air National Guard.

In October 2020, he was nominated for promotion to major general but the nomination was returned by the United States Senate. He was again nominated for promotion in June 2021.

References 

Living people
Year of birth missing (living people)
Place of birth missing (living people)
United States Air Force generals
Brigadier generals